Andrew Felton Brimmer (September 13, 1926 – October 7, 2012) was an American economist and business leader who served as a member of the Federal Reserve Board of Governors from 1966 to 1974. A member of the Democratic Party, Brimmer was the first African American to sit on the Board.

Early life and education 
Brimmer was born in Newellton in Tensas Parish, Louisiana, to a family of sharecroppers. He attended racially segregated schools and graduated from the former Tensas Rosenwald High School in St. Joseph, the seat of government of Tensas Parish. He was a classmate of Emmitt Douglas, later the long-term president of the Louisiana NAACP. Tensas Rosenwald closed in 1970, when the parish public schools were desegregated. The formerly all-white Newellton High School then function as a desegregated institution from 1970 until its closing because of low enrollment in 2006.

Brimmer served in the United States Army from 1945 to 1946. He attended the University of Washington in Seattle, Washington, where he obtained both his bachelor's and master's degrees. In 1951, Brimmer received a Fulbright scholarship to study in India and enrolled in 1952 in Harvard University in Cambridge, Massachusetts. In 1957, he received his Ph.D. from the Harvard University.

Career
While he was still at Harvard, Brimmer worked at the Federal Reserve Bank of New York as an economist, and established the central bank of the Sudan. After graduation, Brimmer became assistant secretary of economic affairs in the U.S. Department of Commerce. In 1966, under appointment from U.S. President Lyndon B. Johnson, Brimmer began an eight-year term on the board of governors of the Federal Reserve, becoming the first African American in that position. In 1974, Brimmer left the Federal Reserve and taught at Harvard University for two years. Thereafter, he formed his own consulting company, Brimmer & Company. He was a trustee of the Economists for Peace and Security.

Brimmer served on the Tuskegee University board of directors from 1965–2010, and as the board's chairman for the last 28 years on the board, making him the longest serving chairman in the school's history.

Awards and honors
Named government man of the year by the National Business League, 1963
Arthur S. Flemming Award, 1966
Russwurm Award, 1966
Golden Plate Award of the American Academy of Achievement, 1967
Elected to the American Academy of Arts and Sciences, 1970
National Urban League Equal Opportunity Award, 1974
Horatio Alger Award, 1974
Elected to the American Philosophical Society, 1976.
Fulbright 40th Anniversary Distinguished Lecturer, Ghana and Nigeria, 1986
 Samuel Z. Westerfield Award, the highest award given by the National Economic Association, 1990, "in recognition of distinguished service, outstanding scholarship, and achievement of high standards of excellence"
Black Enterprise A.G. Gaston Lifetime Achievement Award, 2007
In 2020, the American Economic Association announced the establishment of the "Andrew Brimmer Undergraduate Essay Prize," to be presented to an undergraduate student at a U.S. based institution of higher learning majoring in economics, political science, public policy, or related fields for the best essay on the “economic well-being of Black Americans.”

Personal life and death
Brimmer married the former Doris Millicent Scott. They had a daughter, Esther Dianne Brimmer.

Brimmer died on October 7, 2012 at George Washington University Hospital in Washington.

Bibliography

References

External links 
Statements and Speeches of Andrew Brimmer during his tenure at the Board of Governors of the Federal Reserve System

Archives and records
Andrew F. Brimmer papers at Baker Library Special Collections, Harvard Business School.

1926 births
2012 deaths
Academics from Louisiana
African-American economists
American economists
American financial businesspeople
Federal Reserve economists
Federal Reserve System governors
Harvard Business School alumni
Harvard University faculty
People from Newellton, Louisiana
University of Washington alumni
Lyndon B. Johnson administration personnel
Nixon administration personnel
Ford administration personnel
Members of the American Philosophical Society
Fulbright alumni